The basilica of Damous El Karita is a Tunisian basilica, located in Carthage, dating from the Late antiquity and the Byzantine epoch. It is situated nearby the Odeon hills within the archeological site of Carthage.

Most important and known Christian architectural complex within the capital of the Roman province of Africa, it is according to Noël Duval "one of the most important Christian monuments" but also "most abused and poorly known". The architectural complex, indeed was one of the most important architectural Christian cultural ensembles of North Africa from the late antiquity up to the late middle-ages. The entire ensemble was composed of 2 churches, at least one martyrium, several Hypogeums as well as a subterran rotunda with a complex interpretation.

The importance of the complex suggests that the place was not only a funerary center but also a major pilgrimage site linked to the cults of the saints buried in this place as well as of important religious festivals.

The identification of the basilica is complex but, following recent works, some authors accept the identification with a basilica known by literary sources as the  basilica Fausti .

Etymology 

The current name of the basilica comes from a deformation of the latin  or "house of charity".

Plan 
The ensemble as of the 1990s is still incompletely searched. The known surface of the complex is, however of 15000 m² from which 2925 m² constitutes the quadratum populi.

Basilica 

The most massive element of the complex is a church with nine (then eleven) naves, from which the largest mesures 12.80 metres and eleven bays whose pillars have Corinthian capitals, the barrels of the columns are made out of green marble and the bases out of white marble. The main building is oriented South-West- North-East and mesures 65 metres over 45.

Rotunda 

The most important element of the known appendices is located in the southwest : It is a subterran rotunda, having an interior diameter of 9.15 metres  with a cupola. Two symmetrical stairs, vaulted and in square permit the access ; the ceiling is still partially covered with tubes of terracotta. The corridor is 10.40 metres long and forms an angle before giving access to the underground room. In the past, one corridor permitted entry while the other permitted exit according to Delattre and based on the interpretation of a mosaic found nearby.

References 

Basilica churches in Africa
Archdiocese of Carthage
Churches in Tunisia